Andrea Lynn Evans (born June 18, 1957, in Aurora, Illinois) is an American actress and producer. She is most recognized for her portrayal of Tina Lord on the ABC soap opera One Life to Live, a role she played from 1978 to 1981 and from 1985 to 1990, returning in 2008 and 2011. Evans also appeared on the soap operas The Young and the Restless, The Bold and the Beautiful and Passions.

Career
As a child, Evans appeared in beauty pageants, and later regional theater and commercials. She graduated early from high school and attended the University of Illinois at Urbana-Champaign. While there Evans was cast as an extra in the 1978 Brian De Palma film The Fury, and the same year in the miniseries The Awakening Land. Casting director Mary Jo Slater soon got Evans the role of Tina on One Life to Live, where she stayed until 1981. Evans then went on to portray Patty Williams, Paul Williams' little sister and Jack Abbott's wife, on The Young and the Restless from 1983 to 1984.

Evans returned to One Life to Live in 1985, in a storyline credited with putting the series "back on course" and ultimately bringing Tina to her height of popularity. She was nominated for a Daytime Emmy Award in 1988 for Outstanding Ingenue for One Life to Live, and has appeared on the cover of Soap Opera Digest five times. Evans appeared on the cover of Soap Opera Digest every year from 1986 to 1990.

In January 1990, Evans abruptly quit One Life to Live  and dropped out of public view for nearly a decade. Years later, she revealed that she had left to escape a persistent stalker who had gone as far as breaking into the ABC studios in New York City, intent on killing her. At the time, the stalker incident had been played down heavily in the press. On One Life to Live, the character of Tina moved away to California after her divorce from long-time love interest Cord Roberts.  After a short hiatus, the character returned but with former Playboy Playmate Karen Witter in the role.

Evans made two feature films during the 1990s, performing a small part in A Low Down Dirty Shame in 1994 and a major role in Ice Cream Man in 1995. In 1999, Evans returned to television, appearing as Amber Moore's "trashy" mother Tawny on The Bold and the Beautiful until 2000. That year she stepped into the role of Rebecca Hotchkiss Crane on the NBC soap opera Passions (replacing Maureen McCormick, whose ten-episode stint had ended), where she would stay until the series' final episode. Evans' longtime recurring status on Passions fueled rumors for years of her return to her One Life to Live role of Tina. 

When NBC canceled Passions, it was announced in July 2007 that she would stay with the series for its continued run on DirecTV. Passions finished taping in March 2008, though new episodes were broadcast on DirecTV through August 2008.

In the June 26, 2007 issue of Soap Opera Digest, Evans was asked what her favorite role was besides her current one on Passions; she answered "That's an easy one ... Tina Lord Roberts on One Life to Live because in every actor's life, you hope for a role that becomes bigger than yourself and for me, Tina was that role." ABC announced in April 2008 that Evans would soon return as Tina; she reappeared onscreen on June 11, 2008. Executive Producer Frank Valentini noted,  "Even though Andrea has not appeared on OLTL since 1990, she has remained among the most requested characters to return to the show ... I welcome her home to OLTL and to the role where she made an indelible mark on our audience." Evans' departure from the series was announced on November 5, 2008. Evans and ABC noted that the actress' return was always set to be short-term, as her "life, family and home" are in California while One Life to Live taped in New York City. Valentini continued in a statement, "The character of Tina is a very important part of the OLTL canvas ... [If] there is an opportunity to have her — Tina and Andrea — return at a future date, the show would be happy to explore it." Evans' last appearance was on November 25, 2008.

On April 6, 2010, TVGuide.com announced that Evans would be returning to The Young and the Restless, not as Patty Williams, but as Evans' The Bold and the Beautiful character Tawny. The one-episode stint aired on May 12, 2010. On November 8 of the same year, it was announced that Evans would be temporarily returning to The Bold and the Beautiful as Tawny. While still appearing in recurring capacity on B&B, Evans reprised the role of Tina on OLTL on September 27, 2011, as the series was ending its run. In the story, her character Tina was reunited with her 1980s supercouple partner, Cord Roberts, played by John Loprieno. Her short-term run ended as Cord and Tina remarried on November 15, 2011.

In 2012, Evans had a supporting role in the Joey Lawrence film Hit List. In August 2013, Evans was cast as Vivian Price in the fourth season of the web series DeVanity, which was streamed in 2014. She was nominated for a 2015 Daytime Emmy Award for Outstanding Performer in a New Approaches Drama Series for her performance, and won a 2015 Indie Series Award for Best Guest Actress in a Drama for the role.

Evans was executive producer of the documentary Rocking the Couch, released in 2018.

Personal life
Evans was briefly married to One Life to Live costar Wayne Massey (who played Tina's love interest Johnny Drummond) in 1981. Evans married Los Angeles attorney Steve Rodriguez on January 10, 1998; the couple adopted a daughter in 2004.

Filmography

References

External links
 
Soap Star Stats: Andrea Evans - SoapOperaDigest.com
Rebecca Hotchkiss Crane character profile - SoapCentral.com
Tina Lord Roberts character profile - SoapCentral.com

People from Aurora, Illinois
Living people
American soap opera actresses
1957 births
21st-century American women